Bernard Leo Brophy (August 9, 1903 – July 19, 1982) was a Canadian professional ice hockey player who played 62 games in the National Hockey League between 1925 and 1929. He was born in Collingwood, Ontario. He played with the Montreal Maroons and Detroit Cougars. The rest of his career, which lasted from 1925 to 1936, was spent in various minor leagues. He won a Stanley Cup with the Maroons in 1926.

Brophy's daughter Carol Brophy-Collins was a skating instructor to NHL teams and players like Dave Andreychuk and Nick Kypreos. She was the guest coach at the National Hockey League's officials' training camp in Toronto, and coached players from the Buffalo Sabres, Rochester Americans of the American Hockey League and the Oshawa Generals of the OHA.

Career statistics

Regular season and playoffs

References

External links
 

1903 births
1982 deaths
Canadian ice hockey left wingers
Cleveland Indians (IHL) players
Detroit Cougars players
Detroit Greyhounds players
Detroit Olympics (IHL) players
Duluth Hornets players
Fort Pitt Hornets players
London Tecumsehs players
Ice hockey people from Ontario
Montreal Maroons players
Providence Reds players
Stanley Cup champions
Sportspeople from Clarington
Windsor Bulldogs (1929–1936) players
20th-century Canadian people